Legionella norrlandica is a bacterium from the genus Legionella which has been isolated from a biopurification system.

References

Further reading

External links
Type strain of Legionella norrlandica at BacDive -  the Bacterial Diversity Metadatabase

Legionellales
Bacteria described in 2015